Pinnatella is a genus of moss in family Neckeraceae.

Species
The genus Pinnatellat contains the following species (but this list may be incomplete):

Pinnatella africana 
Pinnatella alopecuroides 
Pinnatella ambigua 
Pinnatella amblyphylla 
Pinnatella anacamptolepis 
Pinnatella angustinervis 
Pinnatella braunii 
Pinnatella caesia 
Pinnatella calcutensis 
Pinnatella callicostelloides 
Pinnatella chalaropteris 
Pinnatella donghamensis 
Pinnatella dupuisii 
Pinnatella elegantissima 
Pinnatella engleri 
Pinnatella filifera 
Pinnatella flagellacea 
Pinnatella foreauana 
Pinnatella fuciformis 
Pinnatella geheebii 
Pinnatella globiglossa 
Pinnatella gollanii 
Pinnatella herpetineura 
Pinnatella homaliadelphoides 
Pinnatella integerrima 
Pinnatella kuehliana 
Pinnatella kurzii 
Pinnatella laxa 
Pinnatella ligulifera 
Pinnatella limbata 
Pinnatella makinoi 
Pinnatella mariei 
Pinnatella mayumbensis 
Pinnatella minuta 
Pinnatella mixta 
Pinnatella mucronata 
Pinnatella nana 
Pinnatella oblongifrondea 
Pinnatella pechuelii 
Pinnatella piniformis 
Pinnatella robusta 
Pinnatella rotundifrondea 
Pinnatella scaberula 
Pinnatella siamensis 
Pinnatella stoloniramea 
Pinnatella taiwanensis 
Pinnatella tamariscina 
Pinnatella thieleana 
Pinnatella uroclada 
Pinnatella usagara

References

Neckeraceae
Taxonomy articles created by Polbot
Moss genera